Atorinka is a rural locality in Mileninsky Selsoviet Rural Settlement, Fatezhsky District, Kursk Oblast, Russia. Population:

Geography 
The village is located on the Usozha River (a left tributary of the Svapa in the basin of the Seym), 105 km from the Russia–Ukraine border, 43 km north-west of Kursk, 1.5 km south-east of the district center – the town Fatezh, 1 km from the selsoviet center – Milenino.

 Climate
Atorinka has a warm-summer humid continental climate (Dfb in the Köppen climate classification).

Transport 
Atorinka is located 2 km from the federal route  Crimea Highway as part of the European route E105, 27.5 km from the road of regional importance  (Kursk – Ponyri), 3 km from the road  (Fatezh – 38K-018), 0.6 km from the road of intermunicipal significance  (M2 "Crimea Highway" – Zykovka – Maloye Annenkovo – 38K-039), 29 km from the nearest railway station Vozy (railway line Oryol – Kursk).

The rural locality is situated 45 km from Kursk Vostochny Airport, 165 km from Belgorod International Airport and 231 km from Voronezh Peter the Great Airport.

References

Notes

Sources

Rural localities in Fatezhsky District